VicLabour, formerly The Victoria University Labour Club, is a branch of the New Zealand Labour Party. The branch is primarily made up of students from Victoria University and Massey University in Wellington, and focuses on issues relevant to young New Zealanders. Members of Vic Labour also play a large role in Young Labour, the youth wing of the party.

The branch is part of the Wellington Central Labour Electorate Committee. It is a "special branch" under the Labour Party constitution which means that members may live outside the boundaries of the Wellington Central electorate and do not have to be students. However, members of VicLabour are in general under the age of 26.

VicLabour's members participate in a wide range of activities including protests, being active in policy development, campaigning and community work.

History 
Victoria Labour Club was established in 1934 by Alfred Katz. The branch was invigorated by Labour activists in the 1960s and helped to organise large opposition protests to the Vietnam War.

Membership has fluctuated often over the years but has always stayed prominent.

Student politics 
Members of the branch have been heavily involved in student politics at Victoria University and Massey University. Andrew Little, former leader of the New Zealand Labour Party and current Minister of Justice, was President of the Victoria University of Wellington Students' Association 1988-89. In 2011 VicLabour members put forward a variety of submissions to try to prevent the VSM bill coming into force and attended a number of protests and readings of the bill at Parliament.

Notable members 
Notable past members include:
David Butcher
Chris Hipkins
Darren Hughes
Andrew Little

See more 
 New Zealand Young Labour

References 

New Zealand Labour Party
Victoria University of Wellington